FK Motorlet Prague is a football club located in Prague-Jinonice, Czech Republic. The club currently plays in the Bohemian Football League, which is the third tier of the Czech football system.

History
The club took part in the 1963–64 Czechoslovak First League. Outside of the top flight, the club played in the 1983–84 Česká národní liga, at the time the second highest level of football in Czechoslovakia.

Youth Teams
FK Motorlet Prague is known for its good work with its youth teams. Each youth team plays in a National Competition with the oldest age category "U19" playing the highest tier of youth football.

Historical names
 1912 Sportovní kroužek Butovice
 1913 Sportovní klub Butovice
 1930 SK Praha XVII
 1948 Sokol Jinonice
 1949 Sokol Šverma Jinonice
 1953 DSO Spartak Praha Motorlet
 1969 TJ Motorlet Praha
 199? SSK Motorlet Praha
 1994 FC Patenidis Motorlet Praha
 2000 SK Motorlet Praha
 2011 FK Motorlet Praha

References

External links
  
 SK Motorlet Prague at the website of the Prague Football Association 

Football clubs in the Czech Republic
Motorlet
Prague, Motorlet
Association football clubs established in 1912
1912 establishments in Austria-Hungary